The 2020–21 Women's Basketball Super League is the 41st edition of the top-tier level professional women's basketball league in Turkey.

The season is the first to be played after the previous season was abandoned due to the COVID-19 pandemic. The previous season was cancelled in May 2020.

Teams

Regular season

League table

Results 
<div style="overflow:auto">

Statistical leaders

| width=50% valign=top |

Points

|}

|}

| width=50% valign=top |

Assists

 

|}

|}

Playoffs

Finals

References

External links
Official Site

Turkish Women's Basketball League seasons
Women
Turkey